Benjamin F. Bonham (October 8, 1828 – June 2, 1906) was an American educator, politician, and judge in Oregon. He was the 9th Chief Justice of the Oregon Supreme Court. Overall he was on Oregon's highest court from 1870 to 1876. Prior to joining the court he was in the Oregon Territorial Legislature and the first State Legislature. Later the Tennessee native served as United States Consul General in Calcutta, India.

Early life
Benjamin F. Bonham was born October 8, 1828 near Knoxville, Tennessee. His parents were John Bonham and the former Sarah Jones. Benjamin was raised in Knoxville and Muncie, Indiana where he received his education at the local schools. After his own education he taught school in Indiana. In 1853 he moved to the Oregon Territory.

Oregon
After arriving in Oregon he took up teaching again, this time at French Prairie and in Salem.  During this time Bonham also studied law, and then joined the bar in 1856. Beginning in 1858 he started his political career when he was elected to the Territorial Legislature. Later that year he served in Oregon's last Territorial Legislature as the citizens awaited statehood. Bonham was then elected to the state's first legislature, serving as a Democrat from Marion County. Each time he served in the legislature, he served in the lower chamber House of Representatives. In 1859, he married in Salem to Mildred A. Baker; they would have seven children.

In 1870, Benjamin Bonham was elected to the Oregon Supreme Court to replace Reuben P. Boise, who would then replace Bonham six years later when Bonham's term ended. While on the court, Bonham served as chief justice from 1874 to 1876. Bonham narrowly lost to Boise by 18 votes after having a 44-vote lead at one point during the vote count.

Later years
In 1885, President Grover Cleveland appointed Bonham to be Consul General to British-controlled India at Calcutta. Later he returned to Salem where he served as postmaster from 1894 to 1898, and was a professor at Willamette University College of Law. He then returned to the practice of law until he died in Salem on June 2, 1906.

References

1906 deaths
1828 births
Members of the Oregon House of Representatives
Members of the Oregon Territorial Legislature
19th-century American politicians
Politicians from Salem, Oregon
Educators from Oregon
Willamette University College of Law faculty
Chief Justices of the Oregon Supreme Court
Oregon postmasters
Politicians from Knoxville, Tennessee
Lawyers from Salem, Oregon
American diplomats
19th-century American judges
Justices of the Oregon Supreme Court